Jonathan Beckwith may refer to:

 Sir Jonathan Beckwith, 4th Baronet of the Beckwith baronets (died 1796)
 Jon Beckwith (born 1935), American microbiologist

See also
Beckwith (disambiguation)